On March 26, 2014, at 2:42 p.m., a nine-alarm fire broke out in a four-story brick row house at 298 Beacon Street in the Back Bay of Boston. Two Boston Fire Department firefighters died fighting the blaze: Lieutenant Edward J. Walsh, 43, of West Roxbury, and Firefighter Michael Kennedy, 33, of Hyde Park. Lieutenant Walsh was from BFD Engine Company 33 and FF. Kennedy was from BFD Ladder Company 15. The fire also injured eighteen others, including thirteen firefighters. The fire was believed to have been started by welders working on a nearby iron railing. On June 9, 2014, a report was released concluding that Walsh and Kennedy's deaths were both accidental.

Fire

Firefighters responded at 2:42 p.m., where a fire was spreading upward from the basement fanned by winds traveling at 40 miles per hour. Deputy Fire Chief Joe Finn, the incident commander, reported that the bodies of two firefighters were found in the basement of the building. The fire companies that both men were assigned to were the first to arrive at the scene. Firefighters then rushed into the building to rescue residents from the upper floors while Walsh and Kennedy ran with a hose down to the basement, where the fire was believed to have originated. The District Fire Chief in charge ordered a second alarm immediately.

A basement window had broken open and allowed high winds to further fuel the fire, which scorched at both men. Two to three minutes into the incident, the men placed a "Mayday" call over their radios signaling they were trapped. Despite rescue efforts, it took about half an hour to recover Kennedy, who was then transported to Massachusetts General Hospital, where he was pronounced dead. Another 13 firefighters were injured during the search, though their injuries were not life-threatening. A small explosion knocked a number of firefighters down a staircase inside the row house, causing burns and musculoskeletal injuries. It took firefighters until the evening to recover Walsh, who was pronounced dead at the scene.

Some of the apartments' residents were rescued from the top floor of the brownstone building, but none were hurt. The fire marks the first time a Boston firefighter has been killed on the job since 2009. Among those who witnessed the fire was Tom Brady, who decided to evacuate with his wife after watching it unfold from their neighboring home.

Victims 
The firefighters died after the fire, aided by strong winds, trapped them in the basement of the brownstone and prevented their colleagues from rescuing them. It has also been suggested that the 45-mile-per-hour winds which helped fuel the fire also triggered an explosion, which also trapped them in the basement. The precise reason the firefighters died after getting trapped remains unknown, but one proposed scenario involves the fire burning through their hose line, cutting off their ability to fight the fire around them.

Investigation 
On April 4, a number of fire officials, including Boston Fire Commissioner John Hasson, blamed the fire on sparks originating from welding being done on a nearby iron railing. The welders, according to these officials, were operating without a permit and apparently tried to warn others after the fire started. However, the welders did not call 9-1-1, which prompted Ken Donnelly and other Massachusetts politicians to call for criminal charges to be brought against the welding company.

On April 22, the Boston Herald reported that Franklin Knotts, the property manager of the building where the fire killed the two firefighters (located at 298 Beacon Street), had filed an affidavit against D&J Iron Works, the Malden-based welding company whose employees had been blamed for starting the fire. In his affidavit, Knotts accused the employees working on the railing on an adjacent building (located on 296 Beacon Street) of driving away from the fire in their truck. The lawsuit itself was filed by Herbert Lerman, who is the executor of the estate of the building's owner, Michael J. Callahan. The supposed president of D&J Iron Works, Giuseppe Falcone, responded that this company does not exist and that he was therefore not responsible for the fire in any way.

A criminal investigation formally concluded in April 2015.  No criminal charges were pressed against D&J Ironworks for the nine-alarm fire, and according to a statement from Suffolk District Attorney Dan Conley, the yearlong in-depth investigation revealed that while carelessness caused a pair of welders to accidentally start the fire at 298 Beacon St. on March 26, 2014, their actions did not constitute reckless or knowing endangerment of human life - hence, no involuntary manslaughter charges.  “We cannot in good faith seek criminal charges for an accident, even one with consequences so tragically devastating,” said Conley. “Some 60 years of Massachusetts jurisprudence have made clear that negligence, even gross negligence, is in the hands of our civil courts.”  

In March 2016, a report released by the National Institute for Occupational Safety and Health concluded that the Boston Fire Department was partly to blame for the deaths of Walsh and Kennedy.

Memorials 
The funeral for Walsh was held on April 2, 2014, at St. Patrick's Church in Watertown, Massachusetts. Thousands of firefighters attended the service, as did Archbishop Sean O'Malley. Walsh was buried next to his father, also a former firefighter. Marty Walsh, the mayor of Boston, appeared at the funeral, and said, "We stand in awe of what he did last week." Edward Walsh's widow, Kristen, asked the Boston Fire Department to find her husband's wedding ring, which they were able to do, after which they gave it to her. Another funeral was held for Kennedy the following day, at Holy Name Church. Kennedy's cousin, Davin Patrick Kennedy, was among those who spoke at the service.

Timeline
Below is a timeline of events that took place prior to and during the fire.

References

External links
 Boston Fire Department Board of Inquiry Report on Incident 14-16454 (298 Beacon St. Fire), March 2016

2014 fires in the United States
2014 in Boston
Back Bay, Boston
Building and structure fires in the United States
Fires in Boston
March 2014 events in the United States
Residential building fires